The Kotwica (Polish for "Anchor") was a World War II emblem of the Polish Underground State and Armia Krajowa (Home Army, or AK). 

Kotwica may also refer to:
Kotwica coat of arms
Kotwica (surname)
Kotwica Kołobrzeg (football), a football club based in Kołobrzeg, Poland
SKK Kotwica Kołobrzeg,  a Polish basketball team based in Kołobrzeg.